The following lists events in the year 2020 in Mauritania.

Incumbents 

 President: Mohamed Ould Ghazouani
 Prime Minister: Ismail Ould Bedde Ould Cheikh Sidiya (until 6 August), Mohamed Ould Bilal (starting 6 August)

Events 
 1 January - New Year's Day, Public holidays in Mauritania
 13 March – The first case of COVID-19 in the country was confirmed.
 30 March – The first COVID-19 death in the country is reported.
 1 May - Labour Day, public holiday
 23 May - Eid al-Fitr (End of Ramadan), public holiday
 25 May - African Liberation Day, public holiday
31 July – Tabaski (Feast of the Sacrifice), public holiday
18 August – Former president Mohamed uld Abdel Aziz (2008-2019) is arrested on charges of corruption.
 21 August - Islamic New Year, public holiday
16 December – Couscous is added to the UNESCO Intangible Cultural Heritage Lists.

Scheduled events
 29 October - Mawlid (Prophet's Birthday), public holiday
 28 November - Independence Day (from France, 1960), public holiday

Deaths
November 23 – Sidi Ould Cheikh Abdallahi, 82, politician, President (2007–2008).

See also

Economic Community of West African States
Community of Sahel–Saharan States
COVID-19 pandemic in Africa
Organisation internationale de la Francophonie

References 

 
2020s in Mauritania
Years of the 21st century in Mauritania
Mauritania
Mauritania